Milan Poparić (born 1978/1979) is a Bosnian Serb criminal, primarily a jewel thief. He is known for a dramatic escape from prison in July 2013. He has been identified by police as a member of a gang of jewel thieves called the Pink Panthers.

Career
Poparić is a known member of the international gang of jewel thieves called the Pink Panthers, who were given that name after hiding a diamond in face cream, similar to a theft portrayed in the movie The Return of the Pink Panther. The Pink Panthers have been said to have stolen around $436 million since 1999.

Poparić was imprisoned for a sentence of six years and eight months in 2009 for the robbery of Swiss jewelry in the city of Neuchâtel. He was imprisoned in Orbe but not in the high-security area; a communication officer in the prison said, "We were never told...that Poparic was a member of Pink Panther group" and that had they known, he would have been kept in a different section.

Escape 
Poparić escaped with Adrian Albrecht, a Swiss man accused of robbery, arson, and money laundering. The escape involved two accomplices outside of the prison who rammed the prison gate and subdued the guards by firing AK-47s. Poparić and Albrecht then climbed over the barbed wire with ladders brought by the accomplices.
Poparić was the third member of the Pink Panthers to escape from a prison in Switzerland between May and July 2013, and his escape was described as having "resembled a scene out of a summer action film".

References

External links 
Pink Panthers at Interpol

Bosnia and Herzegovina criminals
Jewel thieves
Living people
1970s births
People convicted of robbery
Escapees from Swiss detention
Year of birth uncertain